The Wilson County Courthouse is a historic courthouse located in Wilson, North Carolina. It was built in 1924–1925, and is a three-story, rectangular, Classical Revival style brick building. It features Corinthian order porticos in antis.

It was listed on the National Register of Historic Places in 1979, and is located within the Wilson Central Business-Tobacco Warehouse Historic District.

References

External links

County courthouses in North Carolina
Courthouses on the National Register of Historic Places in North Carolina
Neoclassical architecture in North Carolina
Government buildings completed in 1925
Buildings and structures in Wilson County, North Carolina
National Register of Historic Places in Wilson County, North Carolina
Historic district contributing properties in North Carolina